Key Lake Airport  is a regional airport near the Key Lake mine in Saskatchewan, Canada.

See also 
List of airports in Saskatchewan

References

External links

Registered aerodromes in Saskatchewan